The Pernštejn was one of the seven Moravian dynasty families and the most important (uradel) family originating from Moravian nobility. The first mentioned member of House of Pernštejn lived in the 13th century. They took their name after their first main seat – the Pernštejn Castle. Throughout history, Pernštejns held some of the most prestigious offices in both Kingdom of Bohemia and Margraviate of Moravia. Four members of the House of Pernštejn were appointed to the position of Land Hejtman of Moravia at various times. Their power peaked in the 16th century during the life of Vilém II of Pernštejn and his sons. With John Vratislav of Pernštejn the male line of the family became extinct in 1631. The last member of the female line – Polyxena of Pernštejn – then married into the House of Lobkowicz, who incorporated the black aurochs of Pernštejn family into their coat of arms. One of the most important authorities on the Pernstejn family history is the Czech historian Petr Vorel.

History

Rise
The recorded history of Pernštejns starts with Stephen I of Medlov, who became the burgrave of the royal Děvice Castle in the first half of 13th century. He also founded the Convent of Augustinian nuns in Doubravník. Various members of the house under various name appear in historical sources after that. The next firmly established member of the Pernštejn family is Vilém I who held various offices before becoming the Land Hejtman of Moravia in 1421. He sympathized with the teaching of Jan Hus, both his sons – Bavor and Jan II – fought for the side of Hussites during the Hussite Wars. In 1473, Jan II was elected to be one of the four stewards of Margraviate of Moravia. Both brother also financed the expensive reconstruction of the Pernštejn Castle after it burned out in 1457. Jan II's son Vratislav served first as the Highest Chamberlain, then as Land Hejtman of Moravia like his grandfather. He extended the family holdings by buying the domains of Plumlov and Prostějov.

Peak
Vilém II of Pernštejn inherited all family holdings and became the most renowned member of the Pernštejn family. He held the offices of the Supreme Marshall and later the Highest Hofmistr of the Kingdom of Bohemia. He was a skilled manager and acquired vast domains in both Bohemia and Moravia. House of Perštejn was the second richest and the second most powerful noble house in Bohemia after the House of Rosenberg at the time. Inspired by the Rosenbergs, he also built systems of ponds and promoted fish farming on his domains. He was respected for his unusual religious tolerance and lived to a high age of 86 years. The family holdings were then split between his two sons. 
His son Vojtěch I inherited the Bohemian portion of the family holdings. He served as the Highest Hofmistr of the Kingdom of Bohemia like his father. In 1526, after the death of Louis Jagiellon, Vojtěch I was even considered a potential candidate for the emptied throne. He died suddenly at the age of 44 and with no male heirs. 
Vilém II's other son – Jan IV of Pernštejn – inherited the Moravian part of the dominion. He finished the renaissance reconstruction of the Pernštejn Castle, started by his father. In 1526, he was in charge of the martial aid provided to the king Louis Jagiellon before the Battle of Mohács by the lords of Moravia. After his brother's premature death, he became the sole overlord of the Pernštejn dominion and gained the nickname "Jan the Rich". At that time the estimated size of the Pernštejn dominion was three times the size of the Rosenberg dominion. He too held the office of Land Hejtman of Moravia.

Decline
Jan IV the Rich had three sons: Vojtěch II, Jaroslav and Vratislav II. Vojtěch II expanded the family library and started the art collection of Pernštejn family. He and Jaroslav both died without heirs and so the whole dominion was once again in the hands of one person – Vratislav II. Vratislav II of Pernštejn was a well traveled man. He studied at universities in Prague, Vienna, later also in France and Italy. He served as an envoy to the Habsburg kings and – during his stay in Spain – married a local noblewoman Maria Manriquez de Lara. They both moved back to Bohemia and Maria Manriquez brought with her a statue that later became famous as the Infant Jesus of Prague. Their glamorous lifestyle in Prague combined with dowries for their five daughters resulted in a loss of domains and later debts, from which the House of Pernštejn never quite recovered.  
In 1596, his son Jan V was forced to sell the main seat of their family – the Pernštejn Castle. He died a year later on a battlefield. His only son Jan Vratislav also died on a battlefield in 1631 during the Thirty Years War. He was the last male member of House of Pernštejn. His sister – the last female member – died fifteen years later. Through the marriage of Zdeněk Popel of Lobkowicz with Polyxena of Pernštejn – daughter of Vratislav II of Pernštejn – the black aurochs of Pernštejn family was added to the House of Lobkowicz coat of arms where it appears to this day.

Notable family members
Jan II of Pernštejn (c. 1406–1475), Lord Chamberlain of the District Court at Brno
Vilém II of Pernštejn (c. 1435–1521), governor of the Kingdom of Bohemia
Zikmund of Pernštejn (c. 1437–1473)
Vojtěch I of Pernštejn (1490–1534), governor of the Kingdom of Bohemia
Jan IV of Pernštejn (1487–1548), High Treasurer of Moravia
Vratislav II of Pernštejn (c. 1530–1582), diplomat
Polyxena of Pernštejn (c. 1566–1642), catholic patron, founder of Friars Minor Capuchin Monastery in Roudnice nad Labem. Married Zdenko Adalbert Poppel, Prince of Lobkowicz

Notable castles in possession

Pernštejn Castle (before 1285 – 1596)
Helfštýn Castle (1474–1554)
Hranice Castle (1475–1547)
Plumlov Castle (1490 – before 1619)
Pardubice Castle (1491–1560)
Tovačov Castle (1503–1597)
Lanškroun Castle (1507–1588)
Prostějov Castle (1522 – around 1600)
Litomyšl Castle (1552–1646)

References

Sources

Moravian noble families